The 1920–21 season was Galatasaray SK's 17th in existence and the club's 11th consecutive season in the Istanbul Football League.

Squad statistics

Competitions

İstanbul Football League

Standings

Matches
Kick-off listed in local time (EEST)

Friendly matches

Galatasaray Cup
Galatasaray won the cup.

References
 Futbol, Galatasaray. Tercüman Spor Ansiklopedisi vol.2 (1981) page (557, 594)
 1920-1921 İstanbul Futbol Ligi. Türk Futbol Tarihi vol.1. page(42). (June 1992) Türkiye Futbol Federasyonu Yayınları.

External links
 Galatasaray Sports Club Official Website 
 Turkish Football Federation - Galatasaray A.Ş. 
 uefa.com - Galatasaray AŞ

Galatasaray S.K. (football) seasons
Turkish football clubs 1920–21 season
1920s in Istanbul
Galatasaray Sports Club 1920–21 season